Bruce Alfred Bolton (born 31 May 1935, Christchurch, Canterbury) is a former New Zealand cricketer who played in two Tests in 1958–59.

Cricket career
Bolton attended Christchurch Boys' High School. A right-handed opening batsman and useful leg-spin bowler, he played for almost 10 years for Canterbury in New Zealand domestic cricket and then, after a year's break, for a further five seasons for Wellington.

Up to 1958, Bolton had an undistinguished batting record in first-class cricket, but in Canterbury's first two matches of the 1958–59 Plunket Shield season he made 79, 29, 74 and 49, top-scoring for Canterbury three times. He was brought into the New Zealand cricket team for the two Tests against the touring England team at the end of the season. In the first match, which New Zealand lost by an innings, Bolton did well, scoring 33 in the first innings, when he was sixth man out after more than three hours at the crease, and 26 in the second innings. In his second Test, he was run out for 0 in a match that was ended after two days because of rain. He did not bowl in either of his two Tests.

Bolton's one first-class century came the following season, with 138 against Northern Districts, when he shared a first-wicket stand of 214 with future Test captain Graham Dowling. His career best bowling came two seasons later, in 1961–62, with 7–23 against Central Districts, in a season when he took only eight wickets in all matches.

For Wellington later in his career he batted further down the order and in 1969–70 he captained the side.

References

External links
 Bruce Bolton at Cricket Archive
 Bruce Bolton at Cricinfo

1935 births
Living people
People educated at Christchurch Boys' High School
New Zealand Test cricketers
New Zealand cricketers
Canterbury cricketers
Wellington cricketers
South Island cricketers